The NME Awards 2017 were held in London, England, on 15 February 2017, at the Brixton Academy and was hosted by English comedian Huw Stephens. Beyoncé led the nominations with five, followed by the 1975, Bastille, Christine and the Queens and Skepta with four nominations each.

Winners and nominees

Best British Band
Wolf Alice
The 1975
Bastille
Years & Years
Biffy Clyro
The Last Shadow Puppets

Best International Band
Tame Impala
Kings of Leon
Green Day
Metallica
A Tribe Called Quest
Tegan and Sara

Best British Female
Dua Lipa
Adele
Charli XCX
MIA
Kae Tempest
PJ Harvey

Best International Female
Sia
Lady Gaga
Beyoncé
Solange
Christine and the Queens
Tove Lo

Best International Male
Kanye West
Drake
The Weeknd
Frank Ocean
Kendrick Lamar
Chance the Rapper

Best British Male
Skepta
Zayn Malik
Kano
Jamie T
Michael Kiwanuka
Richard Ashcroft

Best New Artist
Blossoms
Zara Larsson
Sunflower Bean
Christine and the Queens
Dua Lipa
Anderson .Paak

Best Album
Kanye West – The Life of Pablo
Skepta – Konnichiwa
The 1975 – I Like It When You Sleep, for You Are So Beautiful yet So Unaware of It
Radiohead – A Moon Shaped Pool
Bastille – Wild World
Beyoncé – Lemonade

Best Track
Tove Lo – "Cool Girl"
Charli XCX – "After the Afterparty"
Skepta – "Man"
Bastille – "Good Grief"
The 1975 – "Somebody Else"
Christine and the Queens – "Tilted"

Best Live Band
Bastille
Slaves
The 1975
Bring Me the Horizon
Christine and the Queens
Wolf Alice

Best Video
Kanye West – "Famous"
Beyoncé – "Formation"
Radiohead – "Burn the Witch"
Slaves – "Consume or Be Consumed"
Rat Boy – "Get Over It"
Wolf Alice – "Lisbon"

Best TV Series
Stranger Things
Fleabag
Game of Thrones
Black Mirror
HUM∀NS
People Just Do Nothing

Best Festival
Glastonbury
Reading & Leeds Festivals
Download Festival
Isle of Wight Festival
Primavera
V Festival

Best Film
Deadpool
My Scientology Movie
Captain America: Civil War
Suicide Squad
Everybody Wants Some!!
Hunt for the Wilderpeople

Best Music Film
Oasis: Supersonic
Nick Cave and the Bad Seeds’ One More Time with Feeling
Sing Street
Gimme Danger
The Rolling Stones: Havana Moon
The Beatles: Eight Days a Week – The Touring Years

Music Moment of the Year
Bring Me the Horizon invade Coldplay’s table at NME Awards 2016
Coldplay’s Viola Beach tribute at Glastonbury
Beyoncé drops Lemonade
Skepta wins Mercury Prize
Pete Doherty plays The Bataclan
The Stone Roses’ first new music in 20 years

Best Re-issue
REM – Out of Time
Pink Floyd – Meddle
Oasis – Be Here Now
Michael Jackson – Off the Wall
DJ Shadow – Endtroducing....
Blur – Leisure

Best Book
 Alan Partridge – Nomad
Johnny Marr – Set the Boy Free
Bruce Springsteen – Born to Run
The Killers – Somewhere Outside That Finish Line
Zayn – Zayn: The Official Autobiography
Sylvia Patterson – I'm Not with the Band

Hero of the Year
David Bowie
Adele
Beyoncé
Millie Bobby Brown
Gary Lineker
Liam Gallagher

Villain of the Year
Donald Trump
David Cameron
Boris Johnson
Nigel Farage
Martin Shkreli
Katie Hopkins

Worst Band
The Chainsmokers
Clean Bandit
Honey G
Nickelback
5 Seconds of Summer
Twenty One Pilots

Best Small Festival
Y Not
Green Man
End of the Road
Festival No 6
Kendall Calling
Slam Dunk

Best Festival Headliner
Coldplay
Radiohead
Biffy Clyro
Adele
Foals
The Stone Roses

Outstanding Contribution to Music
Pulp

References

2017 music awards
2017 in London
2017 in British music
Culture in London
New Musical Express